Ferdinand Thieriot (April 7, 1838 – July 31, 1919) was a German composer of Romantic music and a cellist.

Life and career
Thieriot was born in Hamburg. He was a pupil of Eduard Marxsen in Altona and belonged to the circle of musicians around Johannes Brahms, who was also a pupil of Marxsen. Later, Thieriot was a pupil of Josef Rheinberger in Munich. A close, friendly relationship connected him with his teachers all his life. Thieriot was married to a publisher’s daughter (Ernst Berens, Hamburg), Else Berens. The marriage remained childless. He worked as a music teacher and musical director in Hamburg, Ansbach, Leipzig (1867) and Glogau (1868–1870). Later Brahms recommended Thieriot for the position of Artistic Director of the Styrian Music Association in Graz (1870–1885). The composer always received high praise in concert reviews: "[…] and met with a warm and friendly reception by the audience and deservedly so. […] Excellent work, clarity and good taste regarding the instrumentation; employment of dignified motives full of character […] Enrichment of the concert repertoire". From March 1902 onwards, Thieriot had his home again in Hamburg where he lived until his death. (Performances of his works in concerts at the Hamburg Philharmonic and Singing Academy as well as in Leipzig where he obtained a post in 1897 at the Directorium of the Bach Gesellschaft in Leipzig).

Thieriot's chamber music constitutes a great part of his total output and is judged to be among his finest compositions. He is known to have composed 4 piano trios: Opp. 14, 45, 47 & 90, 13 string quartets, only two of which have been published, 2 Octets (Op. 78 for 4 violins, 2 violas and 2 cellos and Op. 62 for 2 violins, viola, cello, bass, clarinet, horn, and bassoon) a quartet for flute and string trio Op. 84, a quintet for piano and winds Op. 80, a quintet for piano and string quartet Op. 20 and several instrumental sonatas. In addition to the above, several unpublished compositions remain in manuscript awaiting publication.

Wilhelm Altmann, one of the most influential and perceptive chamber music critics of all time, writing of Thieriot's chamber music, states: "Thieriot's chamber music is without exception noble and pure. He writes with perfect command of form and expression."

Thieriot died in Hamburg.

References
 Cobbett's Cyclopedic Survey of Chamber Music (London: Oxford University Press, 1963)
 Wilhelm Altmann: Handbuch fur Streichquartettspieler, vol. 4 (Wilhelmshafen: Heinrichshofen Verlag, 1972)

External links
 Article in German Wikipedia
 Short biography & sound-bites from Op.62 Octet
 Trio Op.28 Score from Sibley Music Library Digital Scores Collection
 

1838 births
1919 deaths
19th-century classical composers
19th-century German musicians
19th-century German male musicians
20th-century classical composers
20th-century German male musicians
German classical cellists
German male classical composers
German Romantic composers
Musicians from Hamburg
Pupils of Eduard Marxsen
Pupils of Josef Rheinberger
20th-century cellists